RSS-TV is an XML-based navigation protocol for Internet media services based on the RSS standard.

The adoption of RSS-TV enables video device manufacturers to develop applications to navigate Internet media services.  Example video devices include set top boxes, game consoles, broadband-connected digital video disc (DVD) players, digital video recorders (DVRs), personal video recorders (PVRs) and next-generation mobile phones. By implementing the RSS TV protocol, these devices provide user access to a growing library of online media (video, audio and games) services.

RSS-TV is an extension of RSS and includes additional XML elements and attributes to enable Premium TV-centric features such as:
 Video on demand (VOD) and Subscription video on demand (SVOD) 
 Navigating media services (video, audio, games) in a hierarchical fashion 
 Capturing user input (such as a user personal identification number (PIN), search query, or email) and automatic search suggestions. 
 Network PVR functionality 
 Secure download of HD content 
 Electronic program guide for live streams 
 Automatic language selection 
 Numeric shortcuts for selecting menu items 

Readers familiar with Digital Video Broadcasting (DVB) can compare RSS-TV with the DVB Service Information standards developed in the 1990s for digital TV EPGs. The difference is that RSS-TV has been developed for two-way Internet Protocol (IP) networks rather than broadcasting networks. RSS-TV leverages the increasing availability of products that support RSS such as caching engines and RSS-enabled content management and publishing systems.

RSS-TV compliant applications can be implemented using any language and operating system including AJAX/HTML, Flash, OpenTV, or C.  Similarly, service providers can use any web service technologies (Java, .NET, PHP) to build RSS-TV compliant services.

Podcasting 
RSS-compliant feeds that use enclosures for video/audio (podcasting) are fully compliant with RSS-TV. RSS-TV compliant clients will display these feeds as a list of menu items and will play (or download) the media.

Encoding 
Similar to other XML-based standards, RSS-TV documents are assumed to be 8-bit Unicode Transformation Format (UTF-8) encoded.

See also
 Media RSS

References 
 RSS 2.0 specification: 
 Hypertext Transfer Protocol (HTTP/1.1): Message Syntax and Routing: 
 RSS-TV specification: 

Digital television
RSS